Parliamentary elections were held in Turkmenistan on 15 December 2013. Although they were the first multi-party elections in the country's history, both contesting parties claimed loyalty to President Gurbanguly Berdimuhamedow. The ruling Democratic Party emerged as the largest faction in the Assembly with 47 of the 125 seats, losing its parliamentary majority for the first time since independence. The elections were criticized by the OSCE, Amnesty International, and opposition groups such as the Turkmen Initiative for Human Rights. Farid Tukhbatulin of the Turkmen Initiative for Human Rights said that there was little difference between the two major parties, arguing that neither truly represented opposition groups.

Background
A new law on political parties was adopted in January 2012, with the government claiming it would make it easier for new parties to be formed to challenge the ruling Democratic Party. Subsequently, the Party of Industrialists and Entrepreneurs was established in August 2012.

Campaign
A total of 283 candidates registered to contest the 125 seats in the Assembly. The Democratic Party put forward 99 candidates, the Party of Industrialists and Entrepreneurs nominated 28 candidates, whilst a further 163 were fielded by groups including a women's union, trade unions and a youth union.

Results

References

2013 in Turkmenistan
Elections in Turkmenistan
Turkmenistan
Election and referendum articles with incomplete results